Bólidos de acero  (English language:) is a 1950 Argentine romantic drama film musical directed and written by Carlos Torres Ríos with music by Ástor Piazzolla.

The film is based on tango dancing, an integral part of Argentine culture.

Cast
Mario Baroffio
Antonio Capuano
Rodolfo Crespi
Nelly Darén
Alberto del Solar
Roberto Durán
Jorge L. Fossati
Luis Laneri
Francisco Lizzio
Ricardo Lorenzo
Domingo Márquez
Tito Martínez
Mario Medrano
Ermete Meliante
Francisco Monet
Ricardo Passano hijo
Roberto Real
María Luisa Santés
Semillita
Oscar Villa
Jorge Villoldo
Diana Wells

External links
 

Argentine musical drama films
1950 films
1950s Spanish-language films
1950 romantic drama films
Tango films
Argentine black-and-white films
1950s romantic musical films
Argentine romantic musical films
Films directed by Carlos Torres Ríos
1950s Argentine films